A  is a subdivision of the cities of Japan that are large enough to have been designated by government ordinance.  Wards are used to subdivide each city designated by government ordinance ("designated city"). The 23 special wards of Tokyo Metropolis have a municipal status, and are not the same as other entities referred to as ku, although their predecessors were.

Wards are local entities directly controlled by the municipal government.  They handle administrative functions such as koseki registration, health insurance, and property taxation. Many wards have affiliated residents' organizations for a number of tasks, although these do not have any legal authority.

List of wards

Special wards of Tokyo
The special wards of Tokyo are not normal wards in the usual sense of the term, but instead an administrative unit governed similar to cities.

See also
District (China), the original use of the ku kanji, still in use in Mainland China
Administrative districts of South Korea, also pronounced gu
District (Taiwan), same use of the ku in administrative divisions in the ROC Free Area

References

Subdivisions of Japan